Rubottom is an unincorporated community in Love County, Oklahoma, United States.  

A post office was established at Rubottom, Indian Territory on Aug. 14, 1902.  It was named for William P. Rubottom, a prominent landowner and cotton gin operator.  At the time of its founding, Rubottom was located in Pickens County, Chickasaw Nation. 

The community is part of the Turner Independent School District.

References

Unincorporated communities in Love County, Oklahoma
Unincorporated communities in Oklahoma